The following is a list of pipeline accidents in the United States in 1994. It is one of several lists of U.S. pipeline accidents. See also: list of natural gas and oil production accidents in the United States.

Incidents 

This is not a complete list of all pipeline accidents. , the Pipeline and Hazardous Materials Safety Administration (PHMSA), a United States Department of Transportation agency, has collected data on more than 3,200 accidents deemed serious or significant since 1987.

A "significant incident" results in any of the following consequences:
 Fatality or injury requiring in-patient hospitalization.
 $50,000 or more in total costs, measured in 1984 dollars.
 Liquid releases of five or more barrels (42 US gal/barrel).
 Releases resulting in an unintentional fire or explosion.

PHMSA and the National Transportation Safety Board (NTSB) post-incident data and results of investigations into accidents involving pipelines that carry a variety of products, including natural gas, oil, diesel fuel, gasoline, kerosene, jet fuel, carbon dioxide, and other substances. Occasionally pipelines are re-purposed to carry different products.

The following incidents occurred during 1994:
 1994 In January, a pipeline ruptured, dumping almost  of oil in the Marais des Cygnes River in Osawatomie, Kansas. In addition to a $804,700 fine, BP Amoco agreed to spend at least $145,300 on a supplemental environmental project involving reconstruction improvements to Osawatomie's water intake.
 1994 On January 16, a pipeline burst during a transfer operation at a tank farm in Saint Louis, Missouri, spilling gasoline. The company knew that some gasoline was missing, but waited until January 18 to confirm and report the loss. About  of gasoline was spilled, with about  entering the Mississippi River. 
The cleanup took more than 600 workers six weeks to complete and cost more than $14 million.
 1994 On February 1, the third explosion in seven years hit a LPG/NGL pipeline terminal in Iowa City, Iowa. Eleven workers at the terminal escaped injury, and six families within  of the terminal were evacuated. The two previous explosions were in 1987 and 1989.
1994 On March 23, in Edison, New Jersey, previous damage caused a  natural gas transmission pipeline to rupture. Several apartment buildings and a number of automobiles were destroyed in the massive fire. One woman died of a heart attack, and at least 93 others had minor injuries. Delays in shutting off one of the pipeline's valves was cited as contributing to the damage.
 1994 On May 8, a Sunoco pipeline leaked gasoline in Indiana County, Pennsylvania, forcing the evacuation of 50 homes. About  of gasoline were spilled.
 1994 On June 2, a Koch Industries pipeline spilled gasoline in Wichita, Kansas. About  were spilled, and some of it caused interruptions in local water supply.
The escaping gas flowed underground, passed through openings in the building foundation, migrated to other floors, and exploded. The accident resulted in 1 fatality, 66 injuries, and more than $5 million in property damage.
 1994 Early on September 22, a resident near O'Fallon, Missouri detected a petroleum smell. The local fire department was called several hours later, noticed an oily mist in the area, and found a leaking pipeline. EPA officials later admitted that someone lied about the spill volume. Over the next ten years, eight attempts at remediation were made before the O'Day Creek was cleaned of all petroleum products.
 1994 On October 8, a lightning strike shut a valve on a Koch Industries crude oil pipeline crossing Gum Hollow Creek while oil was flowing, triggering a pressure buildup that ripped a  hole in a section of the pipe that was already weakened by corrosion. Pipeline employees — unaware of the rupture in the pipe — turned the pipeline pumps back on after the pipeline shut down automatically, sending oil pouring into the creek for about an hour. The spill created a  slick on Nueces and Corpus Christi Bays along the Texas Gulf Coast. Nearly seven years later, delicate coastal marshes that serve as a nursery for shrimp, flounder, crabs and other marine life had not fully recovered. Koch Industries eventually agreed to pay more than $45 million in damages. The company reported to PHMSA that the spill cost zero dollars in property damage.
 1994 In October, record high flooding along the San Jacinto River in Texas led to the failure of eight pipelines crossing the river. Due to the flooding, many other pipelines were also undermined. Ignition of the released products resulted in 547 people receiving (mostly minor) burn and inhalation injuries. Spill response costs exceeded $7 million, and estimated property damage losses were about $16 million.
 1994 On October 17, a natural gas explosion and fire destroyed a one-story, wood-frame building in Waterloo, Iowa. The force of the explosion scattered debris over a  radius. Six people inside the building died, and one person sustained serious injuries. Three people working in an adjacent building sustained minor injuries when a wall of the building collapsed inward from the force of the explosion. The explosion also damaged nine parked cars. A person in a vehicle who had just left the adjacent building suffered minor injuries, and two firefighters sustained minor injuries during the emergency response. Two other nearby buildings also sustained structural damage and broken windows.
 1994 On November 21, a Buckeye Partners pipeline ruptured from incorrect operation in Moon Township, Pennsylvania. About 38,000 gallons of kerosene were spilled.
 1994 A leak of at least  of diesel fuel was discovered on a Koch Industries pipeline near Plover, Wisconsin on November 29.

References

Lists of pipeline accidents in the United States